Tvååker is the second largest locality situated in Varberg Municipality, Halland County, Sweden, with 2,534 inhabitants in 2010. It is located about 15 km south-east of Varberg.

Name
The actual name Tvååker could be translated as twofield (or twoacre). But it is instead a corruption of the name Toaker (1198). The word to has been interpreted as flax, i.e. "flax field".

Education
The village has a lower secondary school, Bosgårdsskolan as well as an upper secondary school, Munkagårdsgymnasiet, which is focused on animal care, agriculture, forestry and landscaping.

Sport
The football team, Tvååkers IF was formed in 1920 and has a male team for the first time as high as 2nd league and a joint female team with Galtabäck in the 5th league. A floorball-team, Tvååkers IBK, was formed in 1986 and played in the top league for two seasons in the early 1990s.

Other sports clubs located in Tvååker include:

 Galtabäcks BK

People from Tvååker
Sven Nylander
Svante Grände

References 

Populated places in Varberg Municipality